Baron Wilson is a title created in 1946 for Sir Henry Maitland Wilson.

Baron Wilson or Lord Wilson may also refer to:
Paul Wilson, Baron Wilson of High Wray (1908–1980), British engineer and administrator
Harold Wilson, Baron Wilson of Rievaulx (1916–1995), UK Prime Minister 1964-1970 and 1974-1976
Henry Wilson, Baron Wilson of Langside (1916–1997), Scottish lawyer and politician
David Wilson, Baron Wilson of Tillyorn (born 1935), Scottish administrator, diplomat and Sinologist
Richard Wilson, Baron Wilson of Dinton (born 1942), British civil servant and politician
Nicholas Wilson, Lord Wilson of Culworth (born 1945), British judge, Justice of the Supreme Court of the United Kingdom